The 2005–06 OPJHL season is the 13th season of the Ontario Provincial Junior A Hockey League (OPJHL). The thirty-six teams of the North, South, East, and West divisions will compete in a 49-game schedule.

Come February, the top eight teams of each division competed for the Frank L. Buckland Trophy, the OJHL championship.  The winner of the Buckland Cup, the St. Michael's Buzzers, competed in the Central Canadian Junior "A" championship, the Dudley Hewitt Cup, and finished.  If they had been successful against the winners of the Northern Ontario Junior Hockey League and Superior International Junior Hockey League, the champion Buzzers would have then moved on to play in the Canadian Junior A Hockey League championship, the 2006 Royal Bank Cup.

Changes
Thornhill Thunderbirds became Toronto Thunderbirds
Buffalo Lightning became Buffalo Jr. Sabres
Ajax Axemen became Ajax Attack
Seguin Bruins join the league
Oswego Admirals join the league
Syracuse Jr. Crunch leave the league

Final standings
as of February 6, 2006

Note: GP = Games played; W = Wins; L = Losses; OTL = Overtime losses; SL = Shootout losses; GF = Goals for; GA = Goals against; PTS = Points; x = clinched playoff berth; y = clinched division title; z = clinched conference title

Teams listed on the official league website .

Standings listed by Pointstreak on official league website .

2005-06 Frank L. Buckland Trophy Playoffs

The Final Four

Division Playdowns

East/South

West/North

Note: E is East, S is South, W is West, N is North, WC is Wild Card.

Playoff results are listed by Pointstreak on the official league website .

Dudley Hewitt Cup Championship
Hosted by Fort William North Stars in Thunder Bay, Ontario.  St. Michael's finished fourth.

Round Robin
Dryden Ice Dogs 3 - St. Michael's Buzzers 2
St. Michael's Buzzers 7 - Fort William North Stars 1
Sudbury Jr. Wolves 5 - St. Michael's Buzzers 2

2006 Royal Bank Cup Championship
Hosted by Streetsville Derbys in Brampton, Ontario.  Streetsville finished in the semi-final.

Round Robin
Streetsville Derbys 4 - Burnaby Express 3 OT
Streetsville Derbys 3 - Fort William North Stars 2
Streetsville Derbys 2 - Yorkton Terriers 1
Joliette Action 4 - Streetsville Derbys 1
Semi-final
Yorkton Terriers 2 - Streetsville Derbys 1

Scoring leaders
Note: GP = Games played; G = Goals; A = Assists; Pts = Points; PIM = Penalty minutes

Leading goaltenders
Note: GP = Games played; Mins = Minutes played; W = Wins; L = Losses: OTL = Overtime losses; SL = Shootout losses; GA = Goals Allowed; SO = Shutouts; GAA = Goals against average

Players selected in 2006 NHL Entry Draft
Rd 5 #138	David McIntyre -	Dallas Stars	(Newmarket Hurricanes)
Rd 6 #169	Chris Auger -		Chicago Blackhawks	(Wellington Dukes)
Rd 7 #186	Peter LeBlanc -	Chicago Blackhawks	(Hamilton Red Wings)

See also
 2006 Royal Bank Cup
 Dudley Hewitt Cup
 List of OJHL seasons
 Northern Ontario Junior Hockey League
 Superior International Junior Hockey League
 Greater Ontario Junior Hockey League
 2005 in ice hockey
 2006 in ice hockey

References

External links
 Official website of the Ontario Junior Hockey League
 Official website of the Canadian Junior Hockey League

Ontario Junior Hockey League seasons
OPJHL